The Irish Ice Hockey League was a top level ice hockey league in Ireland from 2007 until 2010. The official league was founded in 2007, yet amateur leagues have existed since the early 1980s. The league collapsed due to funding issues as they were unable to maintain the major arenas they played in. Many of the teams either collapsed or moved to the recreational league maintained by the IIHA.

History
Following on from the construction of Dundalk Ice Dome and the success of the Division 3 Ice Hockey World Championship held in Dundalk during April 2007 the Irish Ice Hockey Association announced the formation of an all new, all-Ireland Ice Hockey League. The five teams play all of their regular season games at the Dundalk Ice Dome. The league's inaugural champions were the Dundalk Bulls who won the championship by defeating the Dublin Rams 6-3.

Prior to the Irish Ice Hockey League's formation, the only Ice Hockey team in Ireland playing competitive hockey was the Belfast Giants of the UK's Elite Ice Hockey League. Many Irish hockey players seeking to play the sport at a competitive level have had to travel abroad.

Teams

IIHL

Castlereagh Spartans (Belfast)
Dublin Druids
Dublin Rams (Dublin)
Dundalk Bulls (Dundalk) 
Dublin Stags
Dublin Wolves (Dublin) (2008-2009)
Flyers IHC (Dublin)
Junior Belfast Giants (2007-2009)
Dublin Flyers (Dublin) (2007-2009)
Latvian Hawks (Dublin)
Belfast City Bruins (Belfast)
Dundonald Redwings
The Halifax Hockey Club
IceBreakers (2007-2008)

IIHDL

Hawks B
Blackhawks
Whalers
Blackrock Whalers
Dundalk Lady Bulls
Dundalk Bulls, B
Raiders
Dublin Wolves B
Flyers B
Ice Vixons
Cubs

Irish League Champions

 2007-2008 - Dundalk Bulls
 2008-2009 - Dundalk Bulls
 2009-2010 -

References

External links
 Meltzer, Bill "Irish eye continued growth of domestic hockey" at NHL.com Retrieved 07-05-07.
 Meltzer, Bill "Ireland united in hockey" at IIHF.com
Irish Ice Hockey Association
Flyers IHC

 
1
Top tier ice hockey leagues in Europe
ice hockey